New Schaefferstown is a census-designated place in Jefferson Township, Berks County, Pennsylvania.   It is located five miles to the west of Bernville. As of the 2010 census, the population was 223 residents.

Demographics

References

Populated places in Berks County, Pennsylvania